Sir Henry Arthur Blake  (8January 184023February 1918) was a British colonial administrator and Governor of Hong Kong from 1898 to 1903.

Early life, family and career
Blake was born in Limerick, Ireland. He was the son of Peter Blake of Corbally Castle (c. 1805 – bur. St. Ann's, Dublin, 19 November 1850), a Galway-born county Inspector of the Irish Constabulary, and wife (m. Mobarnan, County Tipperary) Jane Lane (Lanespark, County Tipperary, 5 March 1819 – ?), daughter of John Lane of Lanespark, County Tipperary, and paternal grandson of Peter Blake of Corbally Castle, County Galway (? – 1842, bur. Peter’s Well, County Galway) and wife (m. 14 May 1800) Mary Browne, daughter of The Hon. John Browne and wife Mary Cocks and paternal granddaughter of John Browne, 1st Earl of Altamont, and wife Anne Gore. He was included among the descendants the Blakes of Corbally Castle, Kilmoylan, County Galway, the descendants of Peter Blake (? – 1712), who was granted the lands of Corbally, Kilmoylan, County Galway, on 20 December 1697, and wife Magdeline Martin, the Blakes. Peter Blake was a son of Sir Richard Blake and wife Gyles Kirwan.

Blake started out as a clerk in the Bank of Ireland but lasted only 18 months before resigning and commencing a cadetship in the Irish Constabulary in 1857.  He became a special inspector two years later. In 1876, he was appointed Resident Magistrate to Tuam, an especially disturbed district in the west of Ireland, where he was noted as judicious and active. In 1882, he was promoted to Special Resident Magistrate.

Early colonial services
In 1884, Blake was made Governor of Bahamas, a position he held until 1887.  He was appointed to Queensland in 1886 but resigned without entering the administration, following an imbroglio between Secretary of State for the Colonies, Lord Knutsford, and the premier of Queensland, Sir Thomas M'Ilwraith, on the appointment. In 1887, he moved to Newfoundland, where he was governor until the end of 1888, being knighted on 7 November that year. In 1889 he became the Captain-General and Governor of Jamaica. His term was extended in 1894 and 1896, at the request of Legislature and public bodies of the island, until 1897.

Governor of Hong Kong
On 25 November 1898, Blake was appointed Governor of Hong Kong, a position he held until November 1903. Five months before he arrived in Hong Kong, the British government negotiated an agreement with the Qing government which leased the New Territories to British Hong Kong for 99 years. During his tenure, Blake sent in colonial administrators to the New Territories to assert control over the local punti clans. The clans resisted the British takeover of the New Territories, resulting in the outbreak of the Six-Day War; a largely Indian force under the command of British Army officer William Gascoigne managed to defeat the punti clans, with Blake adopting an amiable co-operation policy to prevent further trouble and allowed them to retain traditional laws and customs in regards to land inheritance, land usage and marriage.

Blake left Hong Kong immediately after he attended the laying of the foundation stone of the Supreme Court building (Legislative Council of Hong Kong from 1985 to 2011) on 12 November 1903.

Post-Hong Kong
Blake was appointed Governor of Ceylon at the end of his tenure in Hong Kong in 1903, and he served in that capacity until 1907. This was his last post in the Colonial Service.  A freshly retired Blake impressed George Morrison with his bitterness at not landing a Privy Council sinecure in gratitude for his 41 years' public service.

The Blakes retired to Myrtle Grove in Youghal, County Cork, where they both died and were buried.

Personal life

Blake married twice: Jeannie Irwin in 1862 (she died in 1866), and Edith Bernal Osborne in Ireland, on 7 February 1874 (she was the daughter of MP Ralph Bernal Osborne). He had two sons, and one daughter Olive, who married John Bernard Arbuthnot. During his period as Governor of The Bahamas, a watercolour of his three children, Children Under a Palm, was painted by Winslow Homer. The painting was subsequently featured on the BBC TV programme, Fake or Fortune?

Honours and arms
 Companion of the Order of St Michael and St George (CMG), 1887
 Knight Commander of the Order of St Michael and St George (KCMG), 1888
 Knight Grand Cross of the Order of St Michael and St George (GCMG), 1897
 Knight of Justice of Order of St. John of Jerusalem
 Fellow of Royal Geographical Society (FRGS)
 JP
 DL
 Fellow of Royal Colonial Institute (FRCI)
 Fellow of Institute of Directors (FIoD)
 Honorary Colonel of Ceylon Mounted Rifles
 District Grand Master Ceylon Freemasons
 Member, Council Royal Dublin Society
 Honorary Member, Royal Zoological Society, London

Legacy
The community of Blaketown in Canada was named in his honour when he was the governor of Newfoundland. Blake Garden, Blake Pier (卜公碼頭) and Blake Block (now within the People's Liberation Army Hong Kong Headquarters) are named after him.

The Bauhinia blakeana, discovered in Hong Kong around 1880, was named after him (Blake shared his wife's interest in botany). It became an emblem of Hong Kong in 1965 and has been the official emblem from 1 July 1997. It appears on the flag of Hong Kong and its currency.

The John Crow Mountains in Jamaica were renamed the Blake Mountains in 1890 but the name did not stick.

Publications
 McGrath, Terence, pseud. [i.e. Sir Henry Arthur Blake.] 1880, Pictures from Ireland. Kegan Paul & Co.: London, 1880. Available from archive.org

See also
History of Hong Kong
The Tribes of Galway – see Blake

References

Sources
 Dictionary of Irish Biography, pp. 583–84, Cambridge, 2010.
 Biography at Government House The Governorship of Newfoundland and Labrador

External links

 
 
 https://web.archive.org/web/20121103011435/http://freepages.genealogy.rootsweb.ancestry.com/~battle/celeb/wilde.htm

Governors of British Ceylon
Governors of Hong Kong
Governors of Jamaica
Governors of Newfoundland Colony
British governors of the Bahamas
1840 births
1918 deaths
Fellows of the Royal Geographical Society
Knights Grand Cross of the Order of St Michael and St George
Deputy Lieutenants in Ireland
People from County Limerick
19th-century British politicians
20th-century British politicians